Gannavaram is a suburb of Vijayawada in Krishna district of the Indian state of Andhra Pradesh. It is also the mandal headquarters of Gannavaram mandal which is administered under Gudivada revenue division. It is a neighborhood of Vijayawada in the North side, while the neighborhoods  Mangalagiri and Tadepalli are in the South side and Ibrahimpatnam and Kondapalli are in the west of Vijayawada. Vijayawada International Airport, Medha IT Park, IT companies like HCLTech are located here.

Name Origin
The name Gannavaram is based on the traditional Sanskrit words "Ganna" meaning Sugarcane and "Varam" meaning 'blessing'. Historically Gannavaram used to be a primarily sugarcane-producing establishment. Hence named Gannavaram, 'blessed with sugarcane'.

Transport 

APSRTC operates buses from Gannavaram bus station which also has a bus depot. The airport is located at Gannavaram 13 KM from Centre of the city. Road connectivity is available from here to Various parts of the City.

APSRTC City Bus Routes

Education
The primary and secondary school education is imparted by government, aided and private schools, under the School Education Department of the state. The medium of instruction followed by different schools are English and Telugu. Among the high schools in the area include, Little Lights Free Education High School, APSW Residential School, Z.P. High School, and  Z.P. High School (girls).

The National Institute of Disaster Management was planned to be set up at the town by the higher education department of the state.

References

Neighbourhoods in Vijayawada
Towns in Krishna district
Mandal headquarters in Krishna district